135th meridian may refer to:

135th meridian east, a line of longitude east of the Greenwich Meridian
135th meridian west, a line of longitude west of the Greenwich Meridian